Leonard B. Robinson (September 28, 1963 – August 16, 2015) was an American charity worker who became known as the Baltimore Batman after dressing up as Batman and visiting children in Baltimore, Maryland-area hospitals. He gained fame in 2012 when a video of him being pulled over for an issue with a license plate went viral. On August 16, 2015, he was killed along Interstate 70 when his parked vehicle was struck by another motorist. Many prominent figures have shown support for Lenny's philanthropic ventures as the Caped Crusader, including former Super Bowl MVP Ray Lewis, musician John Mayer, and the official Batman Facebook page. Lenny was an avid Baltimore Ravens fan, and attended both of the Ravens' Super Bowls during the 2000 and 2012 seasons. He befriended some of the Ravens' players and staff members as he often attended their charitable functions, especially if they were for children.

Philanthropy 
Lenny's mission was "to entertain ill and terminally ill children by appearing to them as Batman and teaching them that just as Batman fights battles, no matter how hard or long their health battles may be, with strength of will and determination, there is always hope!" Lenny visited sick children in hospitals, handing out Batman paraphernalia to them, and was sure to sign every book, hat, T-shirt, and backpack he handed out as "Batman". Some of the hospitals he visited included the Children's National Medical Center, Sinai Hospital, and Georgetown University Hospital. In 2016, Laurie Strongin and her non-profit, Hope For Henry Foundation, started the LENNY "BATMAN" ROBINSON HOPE FOR HENRY PROGRAM at Sinai Hospital in Baltimore.

Death
On August 16, 2015, Robinson was returning from a weekend festival in South Charleston, West Virginia, when his Batmobile broke down on Interstate 70 near the community of Big Pool, Maryland. As he was checking the engine, a Toyota Camry struck his custom Batmobile from behind. The Batmobile struck Robinson, who was pronounced dead at the scene.

Baltimore Ravens two-time Super Bowl champion Ray Lewis paid respect to Robinson on his Twitter feed: "The world lost a special spirit. A true living angel. Lenny Robinson will always remain in my heart #baltimorebatman."

Robinson's funeral at Har Sinai Congregation in Owings Mills, Maryland, on August 19, 2015 was attended by hundreds. At the burial site, a black cover with the Dark Knight insignia was placed over Robinson's casket where he was laid to rest.

References

2015 deaths
Businesspeople from Maryland
Road incident deaths in Maryland
People from Baltimore
1963 births
20th-century American businesspeople